Andrew Jackson Higgins (1921-2011) was a judge on the Supreme Court of Missouri between 1979 and 1991, and its Chief Justice from 1985 to 1987.  Previously, he had served as a commissioner for the Supreme Court between 1964 and 1979, and as Circuit Court Judge for Platte County from 1960 to 1964.

Zel Fischer, a current Judge of the Supreme Court of Missouri, clerked for Judge Higgins from 1988 to 1989; Judge Higgins administered Judge Fischer's oath.

After retiring from the bench, Judge Higgins joined the law firm Inglish & Monaco, P.C., in Jefferson City, Missouri. He practiced and was then Of Counsel until his death.

He also became an advocate against plans to change the way Missouri selects its judges.

Sources

1921 births
2011 deaths
Chief Justices of the Supreme Court of Missouri
Washington University School of Law alumni
Central Methodist University alumni
People from Platte City, Missouri
Judges of the Supreme Court of Missouri
20th-century American judges

https://www.courts.mo.gov/page.jsp?id=120176